Shen Yanfei (born December 24, 1979, in Hebei, China) is a female Chinese-born table tennis player who now represents Spain and resides in Cartagena, Murcia.

She competed at the 2008 Summer Olympics, reaching the third round of the singles competition. She also competed in the team competition. In May 2011 she qualified directly for the 2012 Summer Olympics.

Career records
Singles (as of July 6, 2013)
Olympics: round of 16 (2012).
Women's World Cup: 3rd (2012).
World Tour winner (3): Korea Open 2010; Japan Open, German Open 2012. Runner-up (2): Chinese Taipei Open 2006; Spanish Open 2013.
World Tour Grand Finals appearances: 4. Record: SF (2006).
Europe Top-12: 5th (2006, 2011)

Women's doubles
World Tour winner (4): Chinese Taipei Open 2005; China (Guangzhou) Open 2006; Korea, Chinese Taipei Open 2007.
World Tour Grand Finals appearances: 3. Record: winner (2005); runner-up (2006).

Team
Olympics: 9th (2008, 2012).
World Championships: 15th (2010).

References

1979 births
Living people
Spanish female table tennis players
Table tennis players at the 2008 Summer Olympics
Table tennis players at the 2012 Summer Olympics
Table tennis players at the 2016 Summer Olympics
Olympic table tennis players of Spain
Chinese emigrants to Spain
European Games competitors for Spain
Table tennis players at the 2015 European Games
Mediterranean Games bronze medalists for Spain
Competitors at the 2013 Mediterranean Games
Table tennis players from Shijiazhuang
Naturalised table tennis players
Naturalised citizens of Spain
Mediterranean Games medalists in table tennis